Amr Gamal Sayed Ahmed (born 3 August 1991) is an Egyptian footballer who plays for Egyptian club Pharco FC as a striker.

Career

Club
On 28 May 2013, Gamal made his debut with Al-Ahly senior team in 2012–13 Egyptian Premier League match against Ghazl El Mahalla SC. He came off the bench to score the winner in the 90th minute. On 26 December 2013, Gamal played his second league game with Al-Ahly against El-Entag El-Harby in a win 2–0. He came off the bench in the first half and scored a goal.

Gamal was a member of the Al-Ahly squad that won the 2013 CAF Champions League and was included in the squad for 2013 FIFA Club World Cup. He participated against C.F. Monterrey in the second half.

On 27 October 2014, he suffered an injury to his cruciate ligament during the game against Alassiouty Sport in the season of 2014–15 Egyptian Premier League, five minutes after the beginning of the game. After eight months, Gamal returned to football, scoring his first after reappearance on 3 July 2015 against Wadi Degla SC in the same season in a match Al-Ahly won 3–1.

Amr Gamal became the first Egyptian to play in South Africa after Al Ahly agreed a loan deal with Bidvest Wits on 12 August 2017.

On 22 March 2018, HJK Helsinki announced the signing of Gamal on loan until the end of August 2018.

International
On 5 March 2014, he made his international debut with the Egyptian national team vs Republic of Bosnia and Herzegovina national team

International goals
Scores and results list Egypt's goal tally first.

Honours

Club
Al Ahly
 Egyptian Premier League: 2013–14, 2015–16, 2016–17
 Egypt Cup: 2017
 Egyptian Super Cup: 2014
 CAF Champions League: 2013
 CAF Confederation Cup: 2014
 CAF Super Cup: 2014

Bidvest Wits
 Telkom Knockout: 2017

HJK Helsinki
 Veikkausliiga: 2018

References

External links

1991 births
Egyptian footballers
Egyptian expatriate footballers
Living people
People from Qena Governorate
Egyptian Premier League players
South African Premier Division players
Veikkausliiga players
Al Ahly SC players
Bidvest Wits F.C. players
Helsingin Jalkapalloklubi players
Tala'ea El Gaish SC players
Expatriate soccer players in South Africa
Expatriate footballers in Finland
Egypt international footballers
Association football forwards